Aporosa Boginisoko (born 1 January 1969) is a Fijian judoka. He competed in the men's middleweight event at the 1992 Summer Olympics.

References

External links
 

1969 births
Living people
Fijian male judoka
Olympic judoka of Fiji
Judoka at the 1992 Summer Olympics
Place of birth missing (living people)